Ramallo is a partido in the far north of Buenos Aires Province in Argentina.

Ramallo massacre

On September 17, 1999, provincial police opened fire on a getaway car from a bank robbery, and two of the hostages in the car were killed. There are several theories to explain the police action, ranging from incompetence to a scandal involving former president Carlos Menem and the suspicious death of his son.

Famous residents

Sergio Bizzio, writer and director
Federico Luppi, actor
José Massaroli, graphic novelist
Juan María Traverso, racing driver

Settlements
 Ramallo, cabecera municipal (district capital)
 Las Bahamas, Buenos Aires|Las Bahamas
 El Paraíso, Buenos Aires|El Paraíso
 Pérez Millán
 Villa Ramallo
 Villa General Savio

External links

 
Ramallo Ciudad (Spanish)
Ramallo Web (Spanish)

1864 establishments in Argentina
Partidos of Buenos Aires Province